Yakaboyu is a köy (village) in the Hafik of, Sivas Province in Turkey. 

References

Villages in Hafik District